Banora Point High School is a government-funded co-educational comprehensive secondary day school, located in Banora Point, a town in the Northern Rivers region of New South Wales, Australia. 

Established in 2004, the school catered for approximately 600 students in 2018, from Year 7 to Year 12, of whom approximately 12 percent identified as Indigenous Australians and six percent were from a language background other than English. The school is operated by the NSW Department of Education; the principal is Christopher Randle.

See also

 List of government schools in New South Wales
 List of schools in Northern Rivers and Mid North Coast
 Education in Australia

References

External links
 
 Banora Point High School former website
 NSW Schools website

Public high schools in New South Wales
2004 establishments in Australia
Educational institutions established in 2004
Education in Tweed Heads, New South Wales